The 1942–43 Copa México Copa México, was the 27th staging of this Mexican football cup competition.

The competition started on May 30, 1943, and concluded on September 19, 1943, with the final, held at the Parque Asturias in México DF, in which Moctezuma lifted the trophy for first time.

In April 1943 in an initiative of América and Atlante started the professional era in Mexican soccer, Necaxa didn't accept that resolution and decided to retire as well the Selección Jalisco which was dissolved.

The clubs Guadalajara and Atlas as well Orizaba and Veracruz joined the league, so, the Cup Tournament of 1942–43 season was the first one in the Professional Era.

Group stage
Group A

Results

Group B

Results

Second phase

Final

Moctezuma Won the cup

References
Mexico - Statistics of Copa México in season 1942/1943. (RSSSF)

Copa Mexico, 1942-43
Copa MX
Copa
1942–43 domestic association football cups